Longford is a town in Ireland.

Longford may also refer to:

Places

Ireland
Longford, County Longford's county town
County Longford
Longford, County Galway, a townland
Longford, County Laois, a townland
Longford, County Limerick, a townland
Longford, County Mayo, a townland
Longford, County Meath, a townland
Longford, County Offaly, a townland
Longford, County Roscommon, a townland
Longford Demesne, County Sligo, a townland
Longford, County Tipperary, a townland
Longford (County Longford barony), one of a number of baronies (mediaeval administrative districts) of that name in Ireland
Longford (UK Parliament constituency)

England
Longford, Coventry, West Midlands, an area and electoral ward
Longford, Derbyshire, a village
Longford, Gloucestershire, a village near Gloucester
Longford, Greater Manchester, a ward of Trafford
Longford, Kent, a location
Longford, London, Borough of Hillingdon
Longford River
Longford, Market Drayton, Shropshire
Longford, Newport, Shropshire
Longford, Warrington, Cheshire
Longford Castle, near Bodenham, Wiltshire

Australia
Longford, New South Wales, see Acacia nana
Longford, Tasmania, a town
Longford, Victoria, a town

Canada
Longford, Ontario
Longford Mills, Ontario, a community in Ramara

United States
Longford, Kansas
Longford, U.S. Virgin Islands

People
Christine Longford (1900–1980), Anglo-Irish playwright
Elizabeth Pakenham, Countess of Longford (1906–2002), British historian
Frank Pakenham, 7th Earl of Longford (1905–2001), British politician
Longford (film), a 2006 British television drama about his long battle to win parole for the Moors Murderess, Myra Hindley
Longford Lecture
Longford Prize
The Longford Trust
Raymond Longford (1878–1959), Australian film director, writer, producer and actor

Other uses
Esso Longford gas explosion, a 1998 chemical disaster occurring near Longford, Victoria
Longford Circuit, a motor racing street circuit based around the Tasmanian town
Longford Football Club, an Australian rules football club based in the Tasmanian town
Longford GAA, the Gaelic games body for County Longford
Longford Leader, a newspaper published in Longford, Ireland
Longford RFC, a rugby team based in Longford, Ireland
Longford Town F.C., an association football team based in Longford, Ireland

See also 
Earl of Longford